Attachment-based therapy applies to interventions or approaches based on attachment theory, originated by John Bowlby. These range from individual therapeutic approaches to public health programs to interventions specifically designed for foster carers. Although attachment theory has become a major scientific theory of socioemotional development with one of the broadest, deepest research lines in modern psychology, attachment theory has, until recently, been less clinically applied than theories with far less empirical support. This may be partly due to lack of attention paid to clinical application by Bowlby himself and partly due to broader meanings of the word 'attachment' used amongst practitioners. It may also be partly due to the mistaken association of attachment theory with the pseudo-scientific interventions misleadingly known as attachment therapy. The approaches set out below are examples of recent clinical applications of attachment theory by mainstream attachment theorists and clinicians and are aimed at infants or children who have developed or are at risk of developing less desirable, insecure attachment styles or an attachment disorder.

Individual therapeutic approaches

Child–parent psychotherapy (CPP)
Child–Parent Psychotherapy (CPP) is an intervention designed to treat the relationship between children ages 0–5 and their caregivers after exposure to trauma or in high risk situations. This intervention was developed in part from infant-parent psychotherapy, a psychoanalytic approach to treating disturbed infant-parent relationships based on the theory that disturbances are manifestations of unresolved conflicts in the parent’s past relationships. This broader idea is represented as “ghosts in the nursery”, indicating the continued presence of earlier caregiving generations  Infant–parent psychotherapy was expanded by Alicia Lieberman and colleagues into child–parent psychotherapy, a manualized intervention for impoverished and traumatized families with children under the age of 5. In addition to the focus on the parents early relationships the intervention also addresses current life stresses and cultural values. CPP incorporates attachment theory by considering how attachment bonds are formed between child and caregiver. CPP considers how traumatic experiences may influence attachment bonds and how caregiver’s sensitivity may influence the infant’s behaviors.;) CPP also incorporates developmental theories by considering the influences of risk factors and treatment on biological, psychological, social, and cultural development of both the child and caregiver. 
 
The "patient" is the infant–caregiver relationship. The main goal of CPP treatment is to support the parent-child relationship in order to strengthen cognitive, social, behavioral, and psychological functioning. CPP is delivered in one 1-1.5-hour session per week for a year, with both the child and the caregiver/s. In treatment, the child and caregiver are introduced to the formulation triangle. The triangle helps the child and caregiver to visualize how experiences influence behaviors and feelings and how CPP treatment will target those behaviors and feelings to in turn change experiences. CPP treatment encourages joint play, physical contact, and communication between the child and caregiver. The therapist serves to guide treatment, interpret thoughts and behaviors, and emotionally support the child and caregiver.
 
CPP is supported by five randomized trials showing efficacy in increasing attachment security, maternal empathy and goal-corrected partnerships. The trials also showed a reduction in avoidance, resistance and anger. The trials were conducted with low income groups, maltreating families, families with depressed mothers and families where children were exposed to domestic violence.

Training for CPP is conducted through the Early Trauma Treatment Network, a division of the Substance Abuse and Mental Health Services Administration’s National Child Traumatic Stress Network (NCTSN). CPP training lasts 18 months.

Attachment and Biobehavioral Catch-Up (ABC) 
Attachment and Biobehavioral Catch-Up (ABC) is a parenting intervention for primary caregivers of infants or toddlers who have experienced early adversity such as abuse, neglect, poverty, and/or placement instability. It is a 10-week long intervention that consists of 10 one-hour sessions conducted on a weekly basis. Each session is led by a certified parent-coach and occurs at home.

The 3 goals of the intervention are to:

 Increase nurturing behaviors of the caregiver
 Enhance the caregiver's ability to follow the child's lead with delight
 Decrease potentially harsh or frightening behaviors of the caregiver

The ability of young children to regulate their behaviors, emotions, and physiology is strongly associated with the quality of the relationship they have with their caregiver. By changing the caregiver's behavior, ABC also seeks to help young children enhance their behavioral and regulatory capabilities. Studies have shown that ABC improves child attachment quality, increases caregiver sensitivity to child's behavioral signals, and boosts children's executive functioning. While it was originally developed by Dr. Mary Dozier at the University of Delaware for caregivers of infants ages 6–24 months (ABC-Infant), it has since been expanded to include toddlers ages 24–48 months (ABC-Toddler).

The Bakermans-Kranenburg, Van IJzendoorn and Juffer meta analysis (2003)
This was an attempt to collect and synthesise the data to try to come to "evidence-based" conclusions on the best intervention practices for attachment in infants. There were four hypotheses:
 Early intervention on parental sensitivity and infant attachment security is effective.
 Type and timing of programme makes a difference.
 Intervention programmes are always and universally effective.
 Changes in parental sensitivity are causally related to attachment security.

The selection criteria were very broad, intending to include as many intervention studies as possible. Sensitivity findings were based on 81 studies involving 7,636 families. Attachment security involved 29 studies and 1,503 participants. Assessment measures used were the Ainsworth sensitivity rating, Ainsworth et al. (1974), the Home Observation for Measurement of the Environment, Caldwell and Bradley (1984), the Nursing Child Assessment Teaching Scale, Barnard et al. (1998) the Erickson rating scale for maternal sensitivity and supportiveness, Egeland et al. (1990).

The conclusion was that "Interventions with an exclusively behavioural focus on maternal sensitivity appear to be most effective not only in enhancing maternal sensitivity but also in promoting children's attachment security." p212.

Three studies were singled out by Prior and Glaser to illustrate intervention processes which have shown good results. p239-244.

"Watch, wait and wonder", Cohen et al. (1999)
This intervention involved mothers and infants referred for a community health service. Presenting problems included feeding, sleeping, behavioural regulation, maternal depression and feelings of failure in bonding or attachment. The randomly assigned control group undertook psychodynamic psychotherapy.

The primary work is between mother and therapist. It is based on the notion of the infant as initiator in infant–parent psychotherapy. For half the session the mother gets down on the floor with the infant, observes it and interacts only on the infant's initiative. The idea is that it increases the mother's sensitivity and responsiveness by fostering an observational reflective stance, whilst also being physically accessible. Also the infant has the experience of negotiating their relationship with their mother. For the second half the mother discusses her observations and experiences.

Infants in the watch, wait and wonder group were significantly more likely to shift to a secure or organised attachment classification than infants in the psychodynamic psychotherapy group although there was no differential treatment effect in maternal sensitivity. It has been pointed out however that specific caregiver responses to attachment (the precursors to secure attachments) were not measured.

"Manipulation of sensitive responsiveness", van den Boom (1994) (The Leiden Programs)
This intervention focused on low socio-economic group mothers with irritable infants, assessed on a behavioural scale. The randomly assigned group received 3 treatment sessions, between the ages of 6 and 9 months, based on maternal responsiveness to negative and positive infant cues. Intervention was based on Ainsworth's sensitive responsiveness components, namely perceiving a signal, interpreting it correctly, selecting an appropriate response and implementing the response effectively.

It was found that these infants scored significantly higher than the control infants on sociability, self soothing and reduced crying. All maternal components improved. Further, a 'strange situation' assessment carried out at 12 months showed only 38% classified as insecure compared to 78% in the control group.

Follow ups at 18, 24 and 42 months using Ainsworth's Maternal Sensitivity Scales, the Bayley Scales of Infant Development, the Child Behaviour Checklist (Achenbach) and the Attachment Q-sort showed enduring significant effects in secure attachment classification, maternal sensitivity, fewer behaviour problems, and positive peer relationships.

"Modified interaction guidance", Benoit et al. (2001)
This intervention aimed to reduce inappropriate caregiver behaviours as measured on the AMBIANCE (atypical maternal behaviour instrument for assessment and classification). Such inappropriate behaviours are thought to contribute to disorganized attachment. The play focused intervention (MIG) was compared with a behaviour modification intervention focused on feeding. A significant decrease in inappropriate maternal behaviours and disrupted communication was found in the MIG group.

Feedback methods

Videofeedback intervention to promote positive parenting (VIPP)
Developed and evaluated by Juffer, Bakermans-Kranenburg and Van IJzendoorn, this collection of interventions aim to promote maternal sensitivity through the review of taped infant–parent interactions and written materials. The programme can also be expanded to include the parents internal working models (VIPP-R) and/or sensitive disciplinary practices (VIPP-SD). Findings from randomized controlled trials are mixed but overall supportive of efficacy, particularly for "highly reactive infants" and in reducing later externalising behaviours. The various versions show promise but research continues.

Clinician assisted videofeedback exposure sessions (CAVES)
Developed by Daniel Schechter and colleagues. They developed an experimental paradigm informed by attachment theory called the Clinician Assisted Videofeedback Exposure Sessions to test whether traumatized mothers, who often suffered psychological sequalae from a history of abuse and violence, could "change their mind" about their young children. The technique used was to watch video-excerpts of play, separation and similarly stressful moments in the presence of a clinician who asks the mother to think about what she (and her child) might be thinking and feeling at the time of the excerpt and at the moment of videofeedback. It applies the principles of mentalization as an aide to emotional regulation with these traumatized parents. It also involves elements of prolonged exposure treatment, the video-based treatment Interaction Guidance, and psychodynamically-oriented child–parent psychotherapy. Schechter and colleagues showed a significant change in the way mothers perceived their own child and their relationship together.

VIG (video interaction guidance)
In video interaction guidance the client is guided to analyse and reflect on video clips of their own interactions (e.g. a mother with her infant). Research results include that VIG enhances positive parenting skills, decreases/alleviates parental stress and is related to more positive development of the children. VIG is recommended by NICE in the UK.

Public health programs

Tamar's Children
This is a scheme in which a version of the Circle of Security intervention was added to a jail diversion program for pregnant women with a history of substance abuse. Preliminary data indicates a 68% rate of secure infant–mother attachment in the first relatively small (19) sample. This is a rate of secure attachment typically found in low risk samples.

Florida Infant Mental Health Pilot Program
This project tested the provision of 25 sessions of child–parent psychotherapy (see above) for mothers investigated or substantiated for child maltreatment through court-based teams. There were no further reports of maltreatment by participants during and immediately after the programme and positive changes in maternal and child behaviours were noted. The advocacy organisation Zero to Three is supporting such teams being established in other states.

Foster care interventions

New Orleans Intervention/Tulane Infant Team
This is a foster care intervention devised by J.A. Larrieu and C.H Zeanah in 1998. The program is designed to address the developmental and health needs of children under the age of 5 who have been maltreated and placed in foster care. It is funded by the state government of Louisiana and private funds. It is a multidisciplinary approach involving psychiatrists, psychologists, social workers, paediatricians and paraprofessionals—all with expertise in child development and developmental psychopathology.

The aim of the intervention is to support the building of an attachment relationship between the child and foster carers, even though about half of the children eventually return to their parents after about 12 to 18 months. The designers note Mary Doziers program to foster the development of relationships between children and foster carers (ABC) and her work showing the connection between foster children's symptomology and foster carers attachment status. Work is based on findings that the qualitative features of a foster parents narrative descriptions of the child and relationship with the child have been strongly associated with the foster parents behavior with the child and the child's behavior with them. The aim was to develop a programme for designing foster care as an intervention.

The theoretical base is attachment theory. There is a conscious effort to build on recent, although limited, research into the incidence and causes of reactive attachment disorder and risk factors for RAD and other psychopathologies.

Soon after coming into care the children are intensively assessed, in foster care, and then receive multi modal treatments. Foster carers are also formally assessed using a structured clinical interview which includes in particular the meaning of the child to the foster parent. Individualised interventions for each child are devised based on age, clinical presentation and information on the child/foster carer match. The assessment 'team' remains involved in delivering the intervention. Those running the programme maintain regular phone and visit contact and there are support groups for foster parents.

Barriers to attachment are considered to be as follows;
 The disturbed nature of the child's relationship with its parent(s) before their removal by the state. Serious relationship disturbances are considered likely to be important contributors to difficulties in establishing new attachment relationships. Psychiatric and substance abuse histories and other criminal activities are common. Developmental delays in the children are common and there is a considerable range of regulatory, socioemotional and developmental problems. The child may perceive relationships as inconsistent and undependable. Further, despite harsh and inconsistent treatment many of the children remain attached to their parents, complicating the development of new attachment relationships.
 Foster parents may also present barriers to forming healthy attachment relationships. Based on Bowlby, the caregiving system is seen as a biobehavioral system in adults that is complementary to the child's attachment system. Not all foster carers have this strong biological disposition as many fear becoming too 'attached' and suffering loss, many are effectively doing it to earn money and some perceive such children as 'damaged goods' and may remain emotionally distant and under involved.

Interventions include supporting foster parents to learn to help the child in regulating emotions, to learn to respond effectively to the child's distress and to understand the child's signals, especially 'miscues' as the signals of such children are often confusing as a consequence of their often frightening, inconsistent and confusing past relationships. Foster carers are taught to recognize what such children actually need rather than what they may appear to signal that they need. Such children often exhibit provocative and oppositional behaviors which may normally trigger feelings of rejection in caregivers. Withdrawn children may be overlooked and seemingly independent, indiscriminate children may be considered to be managing much better than they are. Foster carers are regularly contacted and visited to assess their needs and progress.

, 250 children had participated in the programme. Outcome data published in 2001 revealed a 68% reduction in maltreatment recidivism for the same child returning to its parent(s)and a 75% reduction in recidivism for a subsequent child of the same mother. The authors claim the programme not only assists the building of new attachments to foster parents but also has the potential impact a families development long after a returned child is no longer in care.

Differentiation from attachment therapy
It is critical to differentiate therapies based on attachment theory from the "unfortunately named" attachment therapy. (However, the use of the terms "attachment therapy" and "attachment-based therapy" is not consistent in literature and on the Internet). Attachment therapy, also known as 'holding therapy', is a group of unvalidated therapies characterized by forced restraint of children in order to make them relive attachment-related anxieties; a practice considered incompatible with attachment theory and its emphasis on 'secure base'. The conceptual focus of these treatments is the child's individual internal pathology and past caregivers rather than current parent-child relationships or current environment. This form of therapy, including diagnosis and accompanying parenting techniques, is scientifically unvalidated and is not considered to be part of mainstream psychology or, despite its name, to be based on attachment theory, with which it is considered incompatible. In 2006, the American Professional Society on the Abuse of Children (APSAC) Task Force reported on the subjects of attachment therapy, reactive attachment disorder, and attachment problems and laid down guidelines for the future diagnosis and treatment of attachment disorders. The Taskforce was largely critical of attachment therapy's theoretical base, practices, claims to an evidence base, non-specific symptoms lists published on the internet, claims that traditional treatments do not work and dire predictions for the future of children who do not receive attachment therapy. The controversy also extends to the theories, diagnoses, diagnostic practices, beliefs, and social group norms and patient recruitment and advertising practices.

See also
 Attachment measures
 Attachment in children
 Child psychotherapy
 Dyadic Developmental Psychotherapy (DDP)
Dynamic-maturational model of attachment and adaptation
 Play therapy
 Mental health
 Parent–child interaction therapy

References

External links
 "Parenting the Child with Attachment Difficulties" from Attachment Disorder Maryland, Inc.
 "Therapeutic Parenting: A handbook for parents of children who have disorders of attachment", 2008

Attachment theory
Psychotherapies
Adoption, fostering, orphan care and displacement